Bad Little Angel is a 1939 inspirational drama film starring Virginia Weidler as an orphan named Patsy Sanderson, living in America around 1900. The film was based on the story "Looking After Sandy" by Margaret Turnbull.

Plot
Treated with contempt in her small New England town, the lonely Patsy takes the advice of a dying woman and decides to live according to verses in the Bible. After reading a verse about Egypt, she flees her orphanage and spends almost all the money she has on a train ticket to a town called Egypt, New Jersey. There she finds friends and a new family, helps the downtrodden, and awakens the consciences of wrongdoers.

Cast
Virginia Weidler as Patricia Victoria 'Patsy' Sanderson
Gene Reynolds as Thomas 'Tommy' Wilks
Guy Kibbee as Luther Marvin
Ian Hunter as Jm Creighton 
Elizabeth Patterson as Mrs. Perkins
Reginald Owen as Edwards, Marvin's Valet
Henry Hull as Red Wilks
Lois Wilson as Mrs. Ellen Creighton
Byron Foulger as New Sentinel Editor (uncredited)
Russell Hicks as Maj. Ellwood (uncredited)
George Irving as Dr. Bell (uncredited)
Mitchell Lewis as Fireman (uncredited)
Terry as Rex the Dog (uncredited)

External links 
 

1939 films
American black-and-white films
Metro-Goldwyn-Mayer films
Films about orphans
1939 drama films
American drama films
Films with screenplays by Dorothy Yost
Films scored by Edward Ward (composer)
1930s English-language films
Films directed by Wilhelm Thiele
1930s American films